Abhiram Bhadkamkar is an Indian actor, director and writer. He mainly worked as a writer in different films, serials and plays. Some of his famous films, as a writer are Balgandharva, Pachadlela, Aai, Khabardar, A Rainy Day, Paulwaat and many more. His famous Marathi plays, as a writer, are Dehbhan, Altun Paltun, Pahuna, Sukhanshi Bhandato Amhi, Ladi Najariya, Hasat Khelat, Jyacha Tyacha Prashna and many more. His plays are performed in Hindi, Kannada and Gujarati in addition to Marathi theatre. A film directed by him is Aamhi Asu Ladke, presented and well received in many international and national film festivals. His collection of stories and novels are published by publishers/ publications of repute. His acting in films has won accolades. He acted in different Marathi and Hindi films and TV serials. Abhiram has written story of upcoming Marathi comedy film Jalsa.

Early life
Abhiram Bhadkamkar graduated in Commerce, obtained a diploma in journalism and communication, graduated from National School of Drama specializing in acting. He is currently engaged in acting, direction and writing in both languages Hindi and Marathi in various forms such as films and plays.

Acting career
Hasat Khelat, Pahuna, Jyacha Tyacha Prashna (Sawal apna apna), Ladi Najaria, Dehbhan and Sukhanshi Bhandto Aamhi are some of his major works, produced by reputed theatre groups and performed all over Maharashtra and Delhi in different languages including Hindi, Kannada and Gujarathi.

Pahuna, Dehbhan and Jyacha Tyacha Prashna are published by Continental Prakashan, a reputed publication in Marathi, and won literature award of Maharashtra Government in 1994, 1995 and 2005. Chudail is a collection of short stories, focusing on the soul and revealing the harsh reality of a most covetous tinsel town. It received an award by Maharashtra Sahitya Parishad, as best short story collection. It is published by Akshar Publication.

Asa Balgandharva… is a biographic novel that depicts the legendary actor singer Balgandharva in all his human attributes, published by Rajhans Prakashan, it received the H. N. Apte Best Novel award.

He has written the films Balgandharva, Aai, Pachadlela, Devki, Khabardar etc. and received Best Dialogue and Best Screenplay award for the film Devki, which also received Best Film award from government of Maharashtra.

Aamhi Asu Ladke is a film  he has written and directed and it has won many awards. It was officially selected for New York Independent International Film Festival and screened in November 2006 in New York and in Harrisburg. And now, his latest hit is Balgandharva (Story, Screenplay and Dialogues).

He has acted in Pachadlela, Ramdeo Ala Re Baba, Devki and Full 3 Dhamal.

Writer

Plays

Movies

TV serials

Literature

One Act Plays

Director

Movies

Documentaries

Acting

Movies

Serials

Awards and nominations
 Chaitraban Puraskar by G. D. Madgulkar foundation – 2006
 P.B. Bhave Puraskar by Pu. Bha. Bhave Smruti Samiti - 2006
 Jaywant Dalvi Puraskar by PCMC Natrya Parishad - 2011
 Mama Varerkar Best writer Award
 Lions Club Award
 Kalnirnaya Award for Best Playwright
 Natyadarpan's Jaywant Dalvi Award
 Alfa Gourav Award
 Ma.Ta.Sanman
 Best Screenplay & Dialogues award from State Government for the film Devki
 Best Dialogues award from Alfa Marathi Channel for the film Devki
 Best Dialogues award from Maharashtra Times for the film Devki
 Best Screenplay & Dialogues award from Marathi Chitrapat Mahamandal for the film Devki
 Best Dialogues award from Maharashtra Kalaniketan for the film Devki
 Best Screen Play award from Government of Maharashtra for the film Khabardar
 Special Jury award from Pune International Film Festival 2006 for the film Aamhi Asu Ladke
 Best Film award from Zee Marathi for the film Aamhi Asu Ladke
 Best Screen Play award from Zee Marathi for the film Aamhi Asu Ladke
 Best Story award from Zee Marathi for the film Aamhi Asu Ladke
 Best Screen Play award in Pune International Film Festival for the film Balgandharva
 Sangeet Natak Academy Award The highest award for an artist by Central Govt.

References

External links
 Abhiram Bhadkamkar Official Website
 Abhiram Bhadkamkar On Facebook
 
 Abhiram Bhadkamkar's Books on BookGanga.com
 Abhiram Bhadkamkar's Videos on YouTube

Indian male film actors
Film producers from Mumbai
Indian game show hosts
Indian male television actors
Indian male voice actors
Living people
Male actors from Mumbai
University of Mumbai alumni
Male actors in Marathi cinema
Male actors in Marathi theatre
Marathi actors
1965 births
Indian male stage actors
20th-century Indian male actors
Male actors in Hindi television
21st-century Indian male actors